Liberty Heights is a neighborhood in southeastern Lexington, Kentucky, United States. Its boundaries are Winchester Road to the north, New Circle Road to the east, and R. J. Corman (former CSX) railroad tracks to the west and south.

Overview

The neighborhood has a mixture of postwar and recent single family home subdivisions, as well as apartment homes.  The business consists of light industrial, service, wholesale and retail. Lexington's first shopping center, Eastland, is located adjacent to Liberty Heights.

History

Most of Liberty Heights was outside the Lexington city limits until the merger of the city and Fayette County.  Despite this, pockets of city coexisted with pockets of "county," sometimes causing confusion of jurisdiction for law enforcement, as there were formerly both Lexington and Fayette County police departments.  

When the Union Depot in downtown Lexington was demolished, the Chesapeake & Ohio Railway (C & O, now CSX) continued passenger service on its George Washington streamliner through Lexington until the 1970s, utilizing a newly built Netherlands yard passenger station on Delaware Avenue. The former C & O passenger station building now houses a church.

Amenities

Public parks
Johnson Heights Park has no direct street frontage and access is via bridge walk from 846 Johnsdale Road, back yards, holes in fences or a sidewalk from the North Maintenance building on Liberty Road. The park features acres of grass, hills, playground, picnic shelter, and baseball and basketball facilities.
The neighborhood boasts two drive-in restaurants.
1950s era drive-in, the Park-ette, is located at the edge of the neighborhood on New Circle Road.  Prior to that road being built as the bypass, the restaurant was reached via a gravel driveway from Liberty Road.
The retro Sonic Drive-In is located on Winchester Road (since closed and is now a Waffle House).
Government services
Liberty Road station branch of USPS is located in the neighborhood.
 Family services is located on Creative Drive.
A Justice of the Peace is in residence at Henry Clay Boulevard and Delaware Avenue.
Transit: two bus lines serve the neighborhood, Eastland (#9) and Hamburg (#10).

Industry

Unicomp, which licensed the IBM keyboard technology from Lexmark, is located on Henry Clay Boulevard.  Its water tower serves as a landmark for the neighborhood.
Clay-Ingels is housed in the former CSX Netherlands rail yard.
Retail is primarily located on the outer boundaries of Winchester and New Circle Roads.  There are some retail locations on Delaware Avenue, Henry Clay Boulevard and Liberty Road. The Lexus dealership is located in the southeast part of the neighborhood.
J.M. Smucker operates the world's largest peanut butter plant, Jif, adjacent to Liberty Heights.

Notable residents

 Louisville-born Mona von Bismarck née Strader was raised on the Strader farm, located at Loudon and Winchester Road. Mona Bismarck was a socialite and fashion icon. She was named to the International Best Dressed List Hall of Fame in 1958.
 Minnesota-born Shirley Ardell Mason lived in obscurity as an artist for the remaining years of her life in the neighborhood, for after her death it was revealed she was the basis for "Sybil Isabel Dorsett" in the book and film Sybil.

Neighborhood statistics

 Population: 2,585
 Land area: 
 Population density: 3,541 per sq mile
 Median household income: $29,074

References

External links
Mona Bismarck Foundation Paris (in English or French)
Clay-Ingels website
R.J. Corman
Parkette Drive-in

Neighborhoods in Lexington, Kentucky